Wickware is an unincorporated community located in the towns of Maple Grove and Prairie Lake, in Barron County, Wisconsin, United States.

Notes

Unincorporated communities in Barron County, Wisconsin
Unincorporated communities in Wisconsin